The Men's 1 km time trial competition at the 2020 UCI Track Cycling World Championships was held on 28 February 2020.

Results

Qualifying
The qualifying was started at 15:18. The top 8 riders qualified for the final.

Final
The final was started at 20:00.

References

Men's 1 km time trial
UCI Track Cycling World Championships – Men's 1 km time trial